Ana Sofia Lopes Malhoa Moreira  known as Ana Malhoa (born August 6, 1979) is a Portuguese singer-songwriter, TV host, actress and businesswoman.  She started her career performing with her father José Malhoa, a popular Portuguese singer, in 1985. With her father, she released seven extended plays between 1986 and 1995. At age of 15 she was cast the host of the children's variety show Buéréré, releasing albums with platinum status and becoming a pop icon in the lusophone countries. In 2000, she released her first studio album, and since then she is the best selling pop artist in Portugal, with sales of over 635,000 copies.

Early life
Ana Malhoa was born in Lisbon on August 6, 1979, daughter of popular singer José Malhoa and Angelina Lopes. She has four half brothers of different mothers and two brothers of different father. She was raised by her stepmother Rosa, who died in 2012, at age of 73. She completed the secondary education as a pop star. The biological mother of Ana, Angelina Lopes, became pregnant of José Malhoa when he was already married to Rosa Malhoa. Three months after giving birth to Ana Malhoa, Angelina Lopes died. At age of 12, Ana found a photo album of Angelina and find out that Rosa was not her biological mother.

In 1998 she married her teenage boyfriend Jorge Moreira (b. 1976) She was married till 2016. She gave birth to their first child, Índia Malhoa, in 1999.
Índia is also a singer in Portugal. In 2021 she started dating the portuguese tenor Rudi Ramos with whom she is expected to marry in the summer.

Discography

Studio albums
 Ana Malhoa (2000)
 Por Amor (2001)
 Eu (2003)
 Eu Sou Latina (2004)
 Nada Me Pára (2007)
 Exótica (2008)
 Sexy (2009)
 Caliente (2011)
 Azucar (2013)
 Superlatina (2015)

Filmography

References

Living people
20th-century Portuguese women singers
Singers from Lisbon
1979 births
Universal Music Latin Entertainment artists
21st-century Portuguese women singers